Algorithmic Number Theory Symposium (ANTS) is a biennial academic conference, first held in Cornell in 1994, constituting an international forum for the presentation of new research in computational number theory. They are devoted to algorithmic aspects of number theory, including elementary number theory, algebraic number theory, analytic number theory, geometry of numbers, arithmetic geometry, finite fields, and cryptography.

Selfridge Prize
In honour of the many contributions of John Selfridge to mathematics, the Number Theory Foundation has established a prize to be awarded to those individuals who have authored the best paper accepted for presentation at ANTS. The prize, called the Selfridge Prize, is awarded every two years in an even numbered year. The prize winner(s) receive a cash award and a sculpture.

The prize winners and their papers selected by the ANTS Program Committee are:
 2006 – ANTS VII – Werner Bley and Robert Boltje – Computation of locally free class groups.  
 2008 – ANTS VIII – Juliana Belding, Reinier Bröker, Andreas Enge and Kristin Lauter – Computing hilbert class polynomials.  
 2010 – ANTS IX – John Voight – Computing automorphic forms on Shimura curves over fields with arbitrary class number.  
 2012 – ANTS X – Andrew Sutherland – On the evaluation of modular polynomials.  
 2014 – ANTS XI – Tom Fisher – Minimal models for 6-coverings of elliptic curves. 
 2016 – ANTS XII – Jan Steffen Müller and Michael Stoll – Computing canonical heights on elliptic curves in quasi-linear time.
 2018 – ANTS XIII – Michael Musty, Sam Schiavone, Jeroen Sijsling and John Voight – A database of Belyĭ maps.
 2020 – ANTS XIV – Jonathan Love and Dan Boneh – Supersingular curves with small non-integer endomorphisms.
 2022 – ANTS XV – Harald Helfgott and Lola Thompson – Summing mu(n): a faster elementary algorithm.

Proceedings
Prior to ANTS X, the refereed Proceedings of ANTS were published in the Springer Lecture Notes in Computer Science (LNCS). The proceedings of ANTS X, ANTS XIII, and ANTS XIV were published in the Mathematical Sciences Publishers Open Book Series (OBS).  The proceedings of ANTS XI and ANTS XII were published as a special issue of the LMS Journal of Computation and Mathematics (JCM). The proceedings for ANTS XV will be published in Research in Number Theory.

Conferences
 1994: ANTS I – Cornell University (Ithaca, NY, USA) – LNCS 877
 1996: ANTS II – Universite Bordeaux 1 (Talence, FR) – LNCS 1122
 1998: ANTS III – Reed College (Portland, OR, USA) – LNCS 1423
 2000: ANTS IV – Universiteit Leiden (Leiden, NL) – LNCS 1838
 2002: ANTS V – University of Sydney (Sydney, AU) – LNCS 2369
 2004: ANTS VI – University of Vermont (Burlington, VT, USA) – LNCS 3076
 2006: ANTS VII – Technische Universität Berlin (Berlin, DE) – LNCS 4076
 2008: ANTS VIII  – Banff Centre (Banff, AB, CA) – LNCS 5011
 2010: ANTS IX – INRIA (Nancy, FR) – LNCS 6197
 2012: ANTS X – University of California, San Diego (San Diego, CA, USA) – OBS 1
 2014: ANTS XI – Hotel Hyundai (Gyeongju, KR) – JCM 17A
 2016: ANTS XII – University of Kaiserslautern (Kaiserslautern, DE) –JCM 19A
 2018: ANTS XIII – University of Wisconsin, Madison – (Madison, WI, USA) – OBS 2
 2020: ANTS XIV – University of Auckland (Auckland, NZ)*
 2022: ANTS XV – University of Bristol (Bristol, UK)

*Moved online due to COVID-19.

References

External links
 ANTS web site

Cryptography conferences
Theoretical computer science conferences
Mathematics conferences
Computational number theory
Recurring events established in 1994